Turrisblanda, was a Roman and Byzantine era colonia (town) in the Roman Empire province of Byzacena in what is today modern Tunisia. Its exact location remains unknown. It was also a capital of an historic diocese of the Roman Empire. The bishopric remains today as a titular see of the Roman Catholic Church. The current bishop is Jan Szkodoń, Auxiliary Bishop of Cracow.

Known bishops
There are three bishops attributed to this diocese.
The Donatist Massimino who attended the Carthage conference of 411, which brought together the Catholic and Donatist bishops of Roman Africa; on that occasion the town did not have the Catholic bishop. 
 Paul who took part in the synod gathered in Carthage by the Huneric the Vandal king in 484, after which Paul was exiled. 
Daziano participated in the antimonotelite council of 641.
The Titular see was established 1933.  
 Jan Pietraszko, Auxiliary Bishop of Cracow  November 23, 1962 – March 2, 1988  
 Jan Szkodoń, Auxiliary Bishop of Cracow  May 14, 1988

References

Roman towns and cities in Tunisia
Lost cities and towns
Catholic titular sees in Africa
Roman towns and cities in Africa (Roman province)